Maria Vladimirovna Dolgorukova (Мария Владимировна Долгорукова in Russian) (1601 – 17 January 1625) was a Tsaritsa of Russia as the first spouse of Tsar Michael I of Russia and the fisrt Tsarita of the Romanov dynasty.

Life
Maria Dolgorukova was born to boyar Knyaz Vladimir Timofeyevich Dolgorukov and Princess Maria Vasilievna Barbashina-Shuiskaya. Her family were of Rurikid stock, and related to the ancient grand princes of Russia.

She was selected for marriage to Michael by his mother, Xenia Shestova, after several years of difficulty of finding a partner for the tsar. In 1616, Shestova refused to accept the tsar's choice of Maria Ivanovna Khlopova, and Michael I had eventually been forced to give up his plans to marry her. In 1619, the tsar's father Patriarch Philaret of Moscow suggested he marry the sister of John, Prince of Schleswig-Holstein, but eventually, these negotiations were discontinued. In 1623, Xenia Shestova selected Maria Dolgorukova as a marriage partner because of her family connections: her sister had been married to prince Ivan Shuisky the Button, brother of Vasili IV of Russia, the last of the Rurikid dynasty.

The wedding took place on 19 September 1624. Not long after the wedding, tsaritsa Maria took ill. She finally died 17 January 1625, four months after the wedding. There were rumors at the time that she had been poisoned by fractions at court determined to prevent any potential pro-Rurikid influence, or by the enemies of the Dolgorukov family. Chronicles called her death a divine punishment for the fate of the previous fiancee of the tsar, Maria Ivanovna Khlopova.

On 7 January, 6 yards of damask was allotted for the presentation of the deceased. This most likely covered the face and body of the deceased. On 8 January the funeral was held. Maria's coffin was upholstered with crimson English cloth. The funeral was ordered by Prince Bogdan Dolgorukov, her cousin, and the priest Vasily Semyonov. Maria Vladimirovna was buried in the tomb of Russian Tsaritas, the cathedral of the Ascension Convent, behind the left pillar by the western doors. In 1929 the remains of all queens were transferred to the basement chamber of the Archangel Cathedral.

The inscription on her sarcophagus reads:

"In the summer of 7133 January, on the 6th day, on the feast of the Ephiphany of our Lord and Saviour Jesus Christ, at 9 o'clock in the morning, by the 7th, the faithful great sovereign Tsar and Grand Duke Mikhail Feodorovich of All Rus', the autocrat, the faithful and noble tsarina Grand Duchess Maria Vladimirovna, reposed on Genvara in 8th day in memory of our venerable father George Khozovit and venerable Domnica."

References

Государство и общество в России XV-начала XX века. // Ред. А. П. Павлов. Стр. 254.

|-

|-

1601 births
1625 deaths
17th-century Russian people
17th-century Russian women
Maria
House of Romanov
Russian tsarinas
Burials at Ascension Convent